Tamil Nadu Dr. J. Jayalalithaa Fisheries University (TNJFU), formerly and commonly known as Tamil Nadu Fisheries University (TNFU), is a government fisheries university situated in Vettar River View Campus in the southern part of the city of Nagapattinam, Tamil Nadu, India. It is one of the premier fisheries universities named after the former Chief Minister of Tamil Nadu J. Jayalalithaa.

History

The members of the High Level Committee of fisheries submitted the proposals to the former Chief Minister of Tamil Nadu J. Jayalalithaa in the presence of M. Radhakrishnan, former Minister for Fisheries Department of Tamil Nadu in 2012 to start a separate fisheries university in Tamil Nadu.

Tamil Nadu Fisheries University Act, 2012 received the assent of the former President of the Republic of India Pranab Mukherjee in 2012. The university was established, exclusively for Fisheries. This affiliating University started functioning from July 2012 and is governed by the said Act. By 2017, It was named after the former Chief Minister of Tamil Nadu J. Jayalalithaa through Tamil Nadu Dr. J. Jayalalithaa Fisheries University, Chennai Act, 2017.

Administration
The Chancellor and Pro-chancellor of the university are the Governor and the Minister for Fisheries Department of Tamil Nadu respectively. The Vice-Chancellor is the main academic officer and administrator in its everyday functioning of the university who is appointed by the Government of Tamil Nadu.

Affiliated colleges 
TNJFU has nine constituent colleges:
Fisheries College and Research Institute, Thoothukudi
Dr. M.G.R. Fisheries College and Research Institute, Ponneri
Dr. M.G.R Fisheries College and Research Institute, Thalainayeru
College of Fisheries Engineering, Nagapattinam
Institute of Fisheries Post Graduate Studies, Vaniyanchavadi, OMR, Chennai
Institute of Fisheries Biotechnology, Vaniyanchavadi, OMR, Chennai
TNJFU - Business School (Fisheries), Vaniyanchavadi, OMR, Chennai
College of Fish Nutrition and Food Technology, Madhavaram, Chennai
College of Fisheries Nautical Technology, Thoothukudi

References 

I
Fishing in India
Universities in Tamil Nadu
Education in Nagapattinam district
Educational institutions established in 2012
2012 establishments in Tamil Nadu